The Shadow Ministry of Gough Whitlam was the opposition Australian Labor Party shadow ministry of Australia from 21 January 1976 to 29 December 1977, opposing Malcolm Fraser's Coalition ministry.

The shadow cabinet is a group of senior Opposition spokespeople who form an alternative Cabinet to the government's, whose members shadow or mark each individual Minister or portfolio of the Government.

Whitlam had not formed a Shadow Ministry after losing government during the 1975 constitutional crisis and had used the title "Leader of the Majority in the House of Representatives" for himself rather than Leader of the Opposition. When the Labor Party lost their majority at the 1975 election, Whitlam returned to use of the Opposition Leader title and a new Shadow Ministry was appointed.

Shadow Ministry (1975–1977)
The following were members of the Shadow Cabinet from 21 January 1976 to 29 December 1977:

See also
 Second Whitlam ministry
 Second Fraser ministry
 Shadow Ministry of Bill Hayden

References

Australian Labor Party
Whitlam II
Opposition of Australia